Michael Dadashi is an American entrepreneur and business executive based in Austin, Texas, best known as the founder of MHD Enterprises and founder and CEO of Infinite Recovery. 
 
Dadashi is also the co-founder of the storytelling platform, HeartWater.

Early life and career 
At age 15, Dadashi started drinking alcohol and soon became an alcoholic. Over the course of several years, he also became addicted to heroin, while occasionally using other drugs like marijuana, cocaine, Vicodin, and Adderall. 
 
Dadashi worked at an e-waste recycling company in California. When he was fired, he returned to Austin in 2006 and founded MHD Enterprises, a similar e-waste recycling business.
 
In June 2009, Dadashi entered rehab and has been sober since. MHD Enterprises also began to grow, earning $7 million between 2008 and 2011 (a growth of 6,277%). Between 2012 and 2014, the company earned a spot on the Inc. 5000 list of the fastest growing companies in the United States. 
 
In 2014, Dadashi founded the Infinite Recovery addiction treatment network, and in 2015 launched the HeartWater storytelling platform.

Advocacy work 
Dadashi is an advocate for addiction recovery and a board member for the non-profit organization, Facing Addiction. Over one-third of the employees at MHD Enterprises are also recovering or former addicts.

References

External links
Official website
Infinite Recovery website

American business executives
Living people
Year of birth missing (living people)
Date of birth unknown